Crystola is an unincorporated community in El Paso and Teller counties, Colorado, United States.  ZIP code 80863 serves Crystola, but mail must be addressed to Woodland Park.

On 27 June 2012, the town came under a mandatory evacuation notice due to the Waldo Canyon Fire.

Geography
Crystola is located at  (38.9558243,-105.0272053).

References

Unincorporated communities in Colorado
Unincorporated communities in El Paso County, Colorado
Unincorporated communities in Teller County, Colorado